David Tao is Taiwanese Mandopop singer-songwriter David Tao's self-titled debut Mandarin solo studio album. It was released on 6 December 1997 by Shok Records.

Track listing

References

External links
  David Tao@Gold Typhoon formerly EMI Music Taiwan

1997 debut albums
David Tao albums